The Design 1016 ship (full name Emergency Fleet Corporation Design 1016) was a steel-hulled cargo ship design approved for production by the United States Shipping Boards Emergency Fleet Corporation (EFT) during World War I. They were referred to as the "Baltimore Drydock"-type.

They were built at two East Coast yards:
Baltimore Shipbuilding & Drydock Company, Baltimore, Maryland, 8 ships, no cancellations
Groton Iron Works, Groton, Connecticut, 6 ships, no cancellations

References

Bibliography

External links
 EFC Design 1016: Illustrations

Standard ship types of the United States
 Design 1015 ships
Design 1016 ships